Karuah River, an open semi-mature tide dominated drowned valley estuary is located in the Mid North Coast and Hunter regions of New South Wales, Australia.

Course and features
Karuah River rises on the southeastern slopes of Gloucester Tops of the Great Dividing Range, below The Mountaineer, southwest of Gloucester, and flows generally southeast and south. joined by eleven tributaries including the Telegherry, Mammy Johnsons, and The Branch rivers, before reaching its mouth within Port Stephens at Karuah, and then flows out to the Tasman Sea of the South Pacific Ocean. The river descends  over its  course.

Etymology
Initially named Clyde by Lachlan Macquarie, the use of the Aboriginal name became prevalent subsequently.

See also

 Karuah River bridge, Monkerai
 Rivers of New South Wales
 List of rivers of New South Wales (A–K)
 List of rivers of Australia

References

External links
 
 Department of Environment and Climate Change report

Port Stephens Council
Rivers of New South Wales
Mid-Coast Council